Stoke-on-Trent Repertory Theatre is a theatre in Stoke-on-Trent, England. It opened in 1997.

The Stoke Repertory Theatre Players present a season of plays each year. The theatre is also a venue for local dance, drama and musical theatre companies.

History

Stoke Repertory Theatre Players 
A group of amateur actors and actresses in Stoke-on-Trent met in 1920 to stage the play Caste by T. W. Robertson, which they performed in February 1921 at the Empire Theatre, Longton. They later created a theatre, converted from a mission church in Beresford Street in Shelton; it opened in March 1933 with the play Lean Harvest by Ronald Jeans. They subsequently presented a season of varied plays each year. The theatre in Beresford Street closed in May 1997.

New theatre
In 1992 the Stoke Repertory Theatre Players were on the verge of purchasing the former Empire Theatre in Longton where the group had performed some years prior, more recently converted into a bingo hall. There were plans to renovate the building back to its original state as a theatre. On New Year's Eve 1992, days before the purchase was due to be completed, the building was destroyed by fire.

The building of the new theatre was subsequently proposed to replace the deteriorating theatre in Shelton. Funds received for the project included donations from local businesses, and a grant from the National Lottery Community Fund. The theatre was designed by Hulme Upright and Partners. It opened in November 1997, with a production of Noises Off by Michael Frayn.

The theatre today
The theatre seats 250. The Rep is a limited company with charitable status, and is staffed by volunteers. The theatre normally presents during the year a season of six plays. It is also hired by local dance, drama and musical theatre companies.

References

Buildings and structures in Stoke-on-Trent
Theatres in Staffordshire
Culture in Stoke-on-Trent
1997 establishments in England